Tunisia is scheduled to compete at the 2024 Summer Olympics in Paris from 26 July to 11 August 2024. Since the nation's official debut in 1960, Tunisian athletes have appeared in every edition of the Summer Olympic Games, except for Moscow 1980 as part of the United States-led boycott.

Competitors
The following is the list of number of competitors in the Games.

Swimming 

Tunisian swimmers achieved the entry standards in the following events for Paris 2024 (a maximum of two swimmers under the Olympic Qualifying Time (OST) and potentially at the Olympic Consideration Time (OCT)):

References

2024
Nations at the 2024 Summer Olympics